Süleyman Atlı (born 27 July 1994 in Fethiye) is a Turkish freestyle wrestler competing in the 61 kg division. He is a member of Ankara ASKI.

Career
He earned a quota spot for the 2016 Summer Olympics with his first-place performance at the 2016 World Wrestling Olympic Qualification Tournament 2 held in Istanbul, Turkey.

Atlı became bronze medalist at the 2017 European Wrestling Championships in Novi Sad, Serbia. In 2021, he won the silver medal in the 61 kg event at the Matteo Pellicone Ranking Series 2021 held in Rome, Italy.

He won the silver medal in the 61 kg event at the 2022 European Wrestling Championships held in Budapest, Hungary. He competed in the 61kg event at the 2022 World Wrestling Championships held in Belgrade, Serbia.

Achievements

References

External links
 
 
 

1994 births
People from Aydın
Turkish male sport wrestlers
Living people
Wrestlers at the 2016 Summer Olympics
Olympic wrestlers of Turkey
Wrestlers at the 2019 European Games
European Games medalists in wrestling
European Games bronze medalists for Turkey
World Wrestling Championships medalists
European Wrestling Champions
Wrestlers at the 2020 Summer Olympics
21st-century Turkish people